Rude Awakening is the debut studio album by American hip hop trio TGOD Mafia, which consists of rappers Juicy J, Wiz Khalifa and record producer TM88. It was released on June 3, 2016, by Atlantic Records, Columbia Records and Empire Distribution. The lone guest appearance is provided by fellow American rapper Project Pat. The album was supported by the single, "All Night".

Release and promotion
On March 21, 2016, record producer TM88 revealed that he along with rappers Juicy J and Wiz Khalifa, were releasing a collaboration album. He also posted a picture of the album's track list on Instagram. Juicy J and Wiz Khalifa were listed at the top of the picture, and beneath their names was the title that said, "Prod. by TM88", which suggested that TM88 had done the production on all of the songs. On May 7, 2016, Wiz hinted at the album title in a tweet and said that the project would be released the following week.

On May 13, a pre-order for the album was made available on iTunes which revealed an updated track list. Initially a collaboration with One Direction's Liam Payne was slated to be included on the album, however, it was removed when it was done on an unfinished demo of the song that was leaked online in April 2016. On May 13, their first official single from the album, titled "All Night" was released on iTunes.

Commercial performance 
Rude Awakening debuted at number 26 on the US Billboard 200, with 15,000 album-equivalent units; it sold 10,000 copies in its first week, and boasted over 4.1 million streams. The album debuted in the top ten of the Billboards Top R&B/Hip-Hop Albums, Independent Albums and Digital Albums charts, reaching the numbers 3, 5 and 9 respectively.

Track listing
Writing credits adapted from BMI and ASCAP.

Sample credits
"All Night" contains a sample from "Lonely Star" performed by The Weeknd.
"Stay the Same" contains a sample from the original composition "Vibez" from Frank Dukes and Chester Hansen.
"Luxury Flow" contains a samples from "Halloween Theme - Main Title" performed by John Carpenter.

Charts

References

Juicy J albums
Wiz Khalifa albums
TM88 albums
2016 albums
Albums produced by Juicy J
Albums produced by Southside (record producer)
Albums produced by Cubeatz
Atlantic Records albums
Collaborative albums
Columbia Records albums
Empire Distribution albums